Lythranidine is a piperidine alkaloid that was first isolated from the plant Lythrum anceps. It contains a 17-membered cyclophane ring.

Several laboratory syntheses have been reported.

References 

Piperidine alkaloids
Cyclophanes